Darliston is a settlement in Jamaica.

Darliston is a town in Westmoreland Parish in western Jamaica. In 1991 the population was 1,435 (2007 estimate 1595). Principal economic activities include the production of breadfruit and livestock.

In 2005 the Government of Jamaica opened a transport centre in Darliston costing $6.6m, funded by the national Urban/Rural Renewal Programme and the Westmoreland Parish Council.

Darliston was the birthplace of S U Hastings, the first Jamaican to be consecrated as a bishop of the Moravian Church.

References

Populated places in Westmoreland Parish